A graphic charter is a document containing the rules regarding the graphic identity of a project, company or organisation. It represents a broadening of the entity's visual identity beyond printed matter and signage to encompass media platforms and audio signatures.

See also 
 Corporate identity
 Style guide

Notes and references 

Graphic design
Printing